Acacia lasiocarpa, commonly known as Panjang or Pajang or glow wattle, is a shrub of the genus Acacia and the subgenus Pulchellae that is endemic to Western Australia.

Description
The branchlets are covered in spines. The foliage is lime green in colour. It blooms from May to October and produces yellow flowers. The rudimentary inflorescences have globular flowerheads containing 16 to 50 golden flowers.

Taxonomy
The species was first formally described by the botanist George Bentham in 1837 as part of the  Bentham, Stephan Endlicher, Eduard Fenzl and Heinrich Wilhelm Schott work Enumeratio plantarum quas in Novae Hollandiae ora austro-occidentali ad fluvium Cygnorum et in Sinu Regis Georgii collegit Carolus liber baro de Hügel. It was reclassified as Racosperma lasiocarpum in 2003 but transferred back to the genus Acacia in 2006.

There are three varieties:
Acacia lasiocarpa var. bracteolata
Acacia lasiocarpa var. lasiocarpa
Acacia lasiocarpa var. sedifolia

Distribution
It is native to an area in the Wheatbelt, Goldfields-Esperance and Great Southern regions of Western Australia with the bulk of the population found south west of a line from Kalbarri to Esperance. The plant is found in a range of habitat including in seasonally damp areas, in and around swamps, on flats and coastal dunes an can grow in a variety of soils.

See also
 List of Acacia species

References

lasiocarpa
Acacias of Western Australia
Plants described in 1837
Taxa named by George Bentham